Italy has participated in the biennial classical music competition Eurovision Young Musicians 4 times since its debut in 1986, most recently taking part in 2002.

Participation history

See also
Italy in the Eurovision Song Contest
Italy in the Junior Eurovision Song Contest

References

External links 
 Eurovision Young Musicians

Countries in the Eurovision Young Musicians